Blerdcon is an annual three-day multi-genre convention held during July at the Hyatt Regency Crystal City at Reagan National Airport in Arlington, Virginia. The conventions name comes from the word "blerds", a term for black nerds. It was co-founded by Hassan Parrish and Hilton George. Blerdcon aims to be diverse and inclusive.

Programming
Blerdcon typically features cosplay contests, concerts, gaming tournaments, maid café, panels, vendors, and workshops. The gaming room is open 24-hours during the event.

History
Blerdcon's idea came out of the experience of attending another convention, MomoCon. First year attendance was higher than expected, with 1,800 people. Blerdcon 2020 was cancelled due to the COVID-19 pandemic. Blerdcon 2021 required attendees to wear masks and provide their COVID-19 vaccination card. The cosplay contest caused controversy in 2021 due to it being won by a white female. Blerdcon in 2022 continued to have mask and vaccination requirements.

Event history

References

External links
 Blerdcon Website

Multigenre conventions
Recurring events established in 2017
2017 establishments in Virginia
Annual events in Virginia
Festivals in Virginia
Virginia culture
Tourist attractions in Arlington County, Virginia
Conventions in Virginia
Crystal City, Arlington, Virginia